Stillman Witt (January 4, 1808 — April 29, 1875) was an American railroad and steel industry executive best known for building the Cleveland, Columbus and Cincinnati Railroad, Cleveland, Painesville and Ashtabula Railroad, and the Bellefontaine and Indiana Railroad. Through his banking activities, he played a significant role in the early years of the Standard Oil company. He was also one of the founding investors in the Cleveland Rolling Mill, a major steel firm in the United States.

Early life
Witt was born January 4, 1808, in Worcester, Massachusetts, to John and Hannah ( Foster) Witt. His family was poor, and he had little education.

The Witts moved to Troy, New York, when Stillman was 13 years old. John Witt ran a tavern on the halfway point between Troy and Albany, New York. Stillman obtained a job earning $10 a month paddling a skiff ferry across the Hudson River. Canvass White, an engineer and inventor, frequently rode the ferry, and became impressed with Stillman's attentiveness, attitude, and drive. After obtaining John Witt's permission, White apprenticed the boy as an engineer and accountant. To augment his apprenticeship, he took lessons at night in accounting and bookkeeping.

Early career

About 1826, White sent Witt to work for the Cohoes Company in Cohoes, New York. White and others founded the firm in 1826. In 1831, the Cohoes Company built a wooden dam across the Mohawk River above Cohoes Falls and later would construct six canals to provide hydropower to various mills, factories, and foundries in Cohoes. Witt went to work as paymaster for the Cohoes Company, although the date of his arrival is not known. Some sources claim that Witt helped to construct the dam and the six power canals, as well as platted the emerging village of Cohoes. If he did so, then it was under the supervision of Hugh White, the brother of Canvass (who had assumed construction supervisory duties, as Canvass White was too busy). Canvass White turned over operation of the Cohoes Company to Hugh White in 1830, before work on the dam began. Canvass White died in 1834, before work on the power canals began.

Witt then went to work as a paymaster and engineer for the Juniata Bridge Company on the Clark's Ferry Bridge in Duncannon, Pennsylvania. Work began on the bridge, which spanned the Juniata River just before its confluence with the Susquehanna River, in 1939 and was completed later that year.

Unclear work history
Witt then traveled to Kentucky, where he was to work on the Louisville and Portland Canal. Sources vary considerably as to the next sequence of events. Two sources say Witt spent 18 months there, but did not finish the work and so returned to Albany. Maurice Joblin, however, says he fell ill shortly after arriving in Kentucky, and returned to Albany for 13 months of recuperation. The New York Times said Witt completed work on the canal (although it did not say how long that took) and then returned to Albany. If Witt worked on the canal, it seems unlikely that he spent much time there. The canal had been completed in December 1830, and the United States Army Corps of Engineers records almost no work done on the canal between 1830 and 1848 (when Witt is known to have been in Cleveland).

The next sequence of events is even cloudier. According to business biographer James W. Campbell, Witt next became an agent for the Hudson River Steamboat Association. Railway Age claimed he was a manager, while The New York Times said he went to work for the People's Line. Joblin, however, says that Witt first captained the James Farley, a steamboat on the Erie Canal, for an unspecified period of time. Witt then captained the Hudson River steamboat Novelty for two or three years, before being hired as a manager by the Hudson River Steamboat Association. Joblin claims he remained with the group until it dissolved in 1841.

Early railroading
About 1840 or 1841, Witt took a managerial position with the Western Railroad.  Witt's position has been variously reported as "general manager", "manager", "general freight agent", and "agent". The Western Railroad itself referred to Witt as a "superintendent" in April 1842, and as an "agent" in 1849. Whatever the scope of his duties, sources agree that Witt was stationed at Albany, and during his tenure oversaw the construction of the depot at East Greenbush (now a suburb of Albany). According to Joblin, Witt spent seven-and-a-half years working for the railroad.

Career in Cleveland

Cleveland, Columbus & Cincinnati Railroad

By the late 1840s, Stillman Witt was well known as a manager and railroad builder. From 1840 to 1843, Frederick Harbach had worked as an assistant engineer on the Western Railroad, and the two men became acquainted. Witt also worked with Amasa Stone, who at that time was active constructing railroad bridges throughout New England. Stone, too, became acquainted with Harbach.

The three men became involved with the Cleveland, Columbus and Cincinnati Railroad (CC&C). The CC&C was chartered in 1836, but for various reasons did not begin construction on the road for more than a decade. In 1847, Harbach left Massachusetts to accept an appointment at the CC&C as chief surveyor of the road. In November 1848, the company finally issued a request for proposals to build the first leg of its line from Cleveland to Columbus, Ohio. Alfred Kelley, an attorney and former state legislator, canal commissioner, banker, and railroad builder, was president of the railway, and he, too, knew Stone well from his railroading days in the east. Kelley and the CC&C managers reached out to Harbach, Stone, and Witt, and asked them to bid on the project. The three men formed a company in late 1848 to bid on the contract, which they then won. Construction began on the line in November 1849, and the final spike was driven on February 18, 1851. Harbach, Stone, and Witt agreed to take a portion of their pay in the form of stock in the railroad. The stock soared in value as soon as the spur was completed, making the three men very wealthy.

Witt was first named a director of the CC&C in 1856, a position he held until 1868. He was elected vice president of the firm as well in June 1863, a position he also held until 1868.

On May 16, 1868, the CC&C merged with the Bellefontaine Railway to form the Cleveland, Columbus, Cincinnati and Indianapolis Railway (CCC&I). Witt was elected a director and vice president of the new company, a position he held until his death in 1875.

Cleveland, Painesville and Ashtabula Railroad
Witt next became involved with the Cleveland, Painesville and Ashtabula Railroad (CP&A). On February 18, 1848, the CP&A received a state charter to build a line from Cleveland to join the Franklin Canal Railroad, whose line ran from Erie, Pennsylvania, to the Ohio border. Alfred Kelley was a director of the CP&A, and on July 26, 1850, the CP&A awarded a contract to build its  line to the firm of Harbach, Stone, and Witt. The line was completed in autumn 1852. Once more Witt and his partners took a large portion of their pay in the form of stock, which made them very rich.

Witt was first elected a director of the CP&A in 1853, a position he held until 1869. He was elected vice president of the company as well in 1859, and held that position 1868.

The CP&A had a close working relationship with the Michigan Southern and Northern Indiana Railway, and in 1860 Witt was elected to the Michigan Southern's board of directors. He held this position at least through 1864.

The CP&A merged with the Michigan Southern & Northern Indiana Railroad in May 1869 to form the Lake Shore and Michigan Southern Railway (LS&MS). Witt was elected a director of the new company, a position he held until his death in 1875.

Bellefontaine and Indiana Railroad

In 1849, Harbach, Stone, and Witt won a contract to build the Bellefontaine and Indiana Railroad (B&I). The Indiana portion of the line was finished in 1852, and the Ohio portion in July 1853. Witt was elected a director of the B&I in July 1853, a position he held until 1865. He was named to the board's executive committee in 1861 and 1862.

Witt was elected a director of the Indianapolis, Pittsburgh and Cleveland Railroad (IPCR) in 1856 after the B&I's sister railroad in Indiana, the Indianapolis and Bellefontaine Railroad, entered into a joint operating agreement with the IPCR on March 14, 1856.

John Brough, a newspaper publisher and president of the Madison and Indianapolis Railroad, was elected the B&I's president in 1862. Witt encouraged Brough to run for Governor of Ohio in 1864. Knowing that Brough could not afford the large reduction in pay, Witt agreed to become president of the B&I and forward his salary to Brough. Brough gave his assent, and continued to receive the income from Witt until Brough's death on August 29, 1865. Brough became one of the greatest "war governors" of the American Civil War.

Witt was elected president of the B&I after Brough died in September 1865, and held that position until the B&I merged with the CCC&I on May 16, 1868.

Other railroads
Frederick Harbach died of a heart attack in February 1851, but Stone and Witt kept the construction firm going.

In December 1853, Stone and Witt won a contract from the Chicago and Milwaukee Railroad to build a  line from Chicago to the Illinois-Wisconsin border. This work consisted of two contracts. The first was to clear and grade the line, and the second was to build the track. This latter work was not finished until 1858. Once more, both men took a significant portion of their pay in stock, and when the stock rose in value they became wealthy. Stone and Witt actually managed operations on a portion of the Chicago & Milwaukee for some time, and Witt was elected to the road's board of directors in 1867.

In 1868, Witt, Stone, and Cleveland businessmen Hiram Garrettson and Jeptha Wade invested in and constructed the Cleveland and Newburgh Railroad. This steam streetcar line cost $68,000 ($ in  dollars) to build, and ran for  down Willson Avenue (now East 55th Street) and then Kinsman Road to the Village of Newburgh (now the southwest corner of the Union-Miles Park neighborhood). Witt was a director of the line in 1874.

In 1868, Witt was elected a director of both the Cleveland and Pittsburgh Railroad and the Indianapolis and St. Louis Railroad.

Witt was elected president of the Valley Railway in 1874, and was still serving in this position at the time of his death the following year. That same year, he was elected a director of the Detroit, Monroe and Toledo Railroad, and was holding that position in 1875 when he died.

Other business interests

Banking
The national news media called Stillman Witt one of Cleveland's greatest bankers of the post-Civil War period.

Witt first entered the banking business in 1856. That year, he partnered with Hinman Hurlbut, James Mason, Henry Perkins, Joseph Perkins, James Mason, Amasa Stone, Morrison Waite, and Samuel Young to purchase the Toledo Branch of the State Bank of Ohio.

Witt was elected a director of Cleveland's Bank of Commerce in 1859. He held that position through 1863, when the bank reorganized as the First National Bank of Cleveland. Witt was elected to the new bank's board of directors.

Witt co-organized the Cleveland Banking Company in 1863 with George B. Ely, George A. Garretson, Amasa Stone, and Jeptha Wade, and was elected to its first board of directors. He held this position until 1868, when it merged with the Second National Bank in 1868. Witt, who had been a director of the Second National Bank since 1866, Witt was elected a director of the merged bank in 1873.

Witt was elected a vice president of the Society for Savings, one of Cleveland's biggest banks, in 1867, and a director of the Commercial National Bank in 1879 and 1873.

Standard Oil

Through his role as one of Cleveland's most respected bankers, Witt played a significant role in the founding of Standard Oil.

In the fall of 1871, Cleveland oil refiner John D. Rockefeller learned of a conspiracy being promoted by Thomas A. Scott (First Vice President of the Pennsylvania Railroad) and Peter H. Watson (then a director of the LS&MS): Using a vaguely-worded corporate charter Scott had obtained from the Pennsylvania General Assembly, the Pennsylvania Railroad, the New York Central Railroad, the Erie Railroad, Standard Oil, and a few small oil refining companies would create and invest in the South Improvement Company (SIC). The SIC's participating railroads would give the SIC's investor-refiners a 50 percent rebate on oil shipments, helping them to drive competitors out of business. Additionally, any time the SIC carried the oil of a non-participating refiner, the SIC would give a 40-cents-per-barrel payment ($ in  dollars) to the investor-refiners. The SIC would also provide the investor-refiners with information on the shipments of their competitors, giving them a critical advantage in pricing and sales.

Rockefeller saw the SIC as the ideal mechanism for achieving another goal: A monopoly on oil refining in Cleveland. Once the SIC had severely weakened his competitors, Standard Oil would buy out the city's 26 major oil refining companies at fire sale prices. The monopoly would allow Standard Oil to dominate the national refining market, garner significantly higher profits, and drive even more competitors out of business. With higher profits, Standard Oil could then rapidly expand, becoming the nation's dominant oil refining company. To make the purchases, Standard Oil needed cash. To secure the cash, Rockefeller allowed Amasa Stone, Stillman Witt, Benjamin Brewster, and Truman P. Handy—all of whom were officers in Cleveland banks—to buy shares in Standard Oil at par in December 1871. Witt and the other bankers used their influence at their own and other banks to give Rockefeller the financial backing he needed. Witt now owned the equivalent of 5 percent of the entire outstanding stock of Standard Oil.

The SIC conspiracy collapsed in March 1872, but between February 17 and March 28, 1872, Rockefeller was able to buy out 22 of the 26 major refiners in Cleveland, an event which historians call "the Cleveland Massacre". Witt played a part in the success of the event. Rockefeller knew that if he bought out the weak refiners first, he'd generate opposition and never get a chance to take on the larger, more profitable ones. So he tackled his strongest competitor, the firm of Clark, Payne & Co., led by Oliver Hazard Payne and backed by the wealthy J. G. Hussey family. In December 1871, Rockefeller asked Payne to meet him at the Second National Bank in Cleveland to discuss business matters in which the bank had an interest. Witt and Amasa Stone were both officers in the bank. Payne swiftly agreed to a merger of his interests with Rockefeller's, and the transaction closed in early January 1872.

Witt continued to play a role in aiding Standard Oil financially. Rockefeller approached the Second National Bank for a major loan in early 1872. Amasa Stone expected the much younger Rockefeller to be deferential and suppliant, but he was not. Stone angrily opposed the loan during a bank board of directors meeting. After Rockefeller made his case to the board, Stone suggested that Payne and Witt arbitrate the dispute. The two officers voted to support Rockefeller.

Witt once more came to Rockefeller's aid a few months later. On July 30–31, 1872, Standard Oil's terminal at Hunters Point, New York, suffered a devastating fire. With the company's insurer refusing to pay until after an investigation, Standard Oil was in desperate need for cash to rebuild. The officers of the company asked Rockefeller to seek another loan from the Second National Bank. At a meeting between Rockefeller and the bank's directors, Stone demanded that Standard Oil be appraised and its financial condition assessed before any loan was issued. Offended, Stillman Witt approved the loan, and Stone was stymied.

Steel, telegraphy, and insurance
Stillman Witt also had financial interests in the iron and steel industry. The iron and steel manufacturing firm of Chisholm, Jones and Company had organized in 1857. It was reorganized in 1860 as Stone, Chisholm & Jones after receiving major investments from Stillman Witt, Henry Chisholm, Amasa Stone, Andros Stone, Henry B. Payne, and Jeptha Wade. Witt made a second investment in the firm in November 1863, reorganizing the steel mill into the Cleveland Rolling Mill (later known as the American Steel & Wire Co.). Witt was named a director of the new company. Witt was elected a director of the Mercer Iron & Coal Company in 1865, director of the Pittsburgh and Lake Angeline Iron Company in 1870, and president of the Union Steel Screw Company (a new firm organized by himself, Henry Chisholm, William Chisholm, Henry Payne, Amasa Stone, and Andros Stone) in 1872.

Through his association with Jeptha Wade, Witt also served on the board of directors of Western Union from October 1869 to October 1872.

Witt also co-founded and was the first president of the Sun Insurance Company. Organized in Ohio, it spread to Massachusetts in 1869; Wisconsin in 1870; Kentucky, Illinois, and New York in 1872; and Michigan in 1874. He was still president at the time of his death.

Charitable activities
Stillman Witt was a lifelong Baptist. He co-founded the Protestant Home for the Friendless Stranger (an orphan asylum) in Cleveland in 1852, and served as its president in 1866. He was elected a national lay director of the American Baptist Foreign Mission Society in 1869, and built Idaka Chapel in 1874 for use as a missionary church by First Baptist Church of Cleveland (of which he was a member).

Witt's charitable endeavors were widespread. He co-founded in 1854 and served on the first board of directors of the Cleveland Female Seminary, a school for girls and young women (located on Kinsman Avenue [now Woodland Avenue] between Sawtell Avenue and Wallingford Court). He served on the board of directors for the secular Cleveland Orphan Asylum in 1858 and as one of its trustees in 1867. He served as a trustee of the Ohio State Institution for the Blind from 1865 to 1870, and was one of the largest donors to the Cleveland Charity Hospital (now St. Vincent Charity Medical Center) when it was founded in July 1865. Shortly before his death in 1875, he was elected a vice president of the Cleveland ASPCA.

Witt was civic minded as well. He served as a founding member of the Cuyahoga County Military Committee, which formed in 1863 to help recruit volunteers to fight for the Union during the American Civil War. Company A of the 124th Ohio Infantry was known as the "Stillman Witt Guards". He also served as treasurer of a committee which raised funds for needy soldiers' families. His service found national expression when he was elected an associate member of the United States Sanitary Commission in 1861. He remained on the commission through 1864.

Witt's work for the Sanitary Commission garnered him national attention. He was so well-respected that he was appointed an honorary pallbearer for the coffin of Abraham Lincoln when Lincoln's remains were transported through Cleveland on their way to Illinois in April 1865. He became friendly with a number of President Lincoln's associates through his Sanitary Commission work as well. In 1869, Witt discovered that former Secretary of War Edwin M. Stanton was impoverished after leaving the federal government. Witt quietly gave Stanton $5,000 ($ in  dollars) to lift his family out of poverty.

Witt was also one of the major original investors in Cleveland's Lake View Cemetery when that organization was first founded in 1869. He was elected to the Lake View Cemetery Association's first board of trustees in 1870.

Death

About 1871, Witt fell ill with rheumatism (probably rheumatoid arthritis gout). He traveled to Hot Springs, Arkansas, in 1873 to seek relief, and appeared to recover. The disease returned in 1874, and this time he sought treatment at the mineral springs at Green Springs, Ohio.

With the illness still afflicting him, Witt decided to travel to Europe in late spring of 1875 to seek the restoration of his health. He sailed for Europe on the SS Suevia. A severe storm struck the ship after a few days at sea. The storm appeared to have significantly abated, and Witt ventured on deck with other passengers on April 28. He was thrown from his deck chair by a sudden wave, and injured his head. The wound appeared minor, but the following day he began to suffer from a migraine. His physical health rapidly declined during that day, and he was attended to by his personal physician and the ship's doctor. He appeared to rally, but died peacefully in his sleep at about 11 PM local ship's time on April 29.

Witt's death caused widespread mourning in Cleveland, where he had an immense reputation for integrity and management. His death was "a public calamity", the Cleveland Leader newspaper declared. Stillman Witt was interred at Albany Rural Cemetery near Albany, New York.

Witt left a fortune worth $3 million ($ in  dollars) to his wife and daughters.

Personal life
Stillman Witt married Eliza Arnold Douglass in June 1834.

The Witts had four children: Emma, Eugenia, Giles, and Mary. Only Emma and Mary survived into adulthood.

Legacy
About 1851 or 1852, Stillman Witt built a mansion for his family at what is now 1115 Euclid Avenue in Cleveland. Considered one of the most beautiful homes in Cleveland at the time, the Neoclassical style edifice featured massive Ionic columns in front. The mansion was remodeled in 1875, shortly before his death. Witt's home helped cement Euclid Avenue's reputation as a location for the wealthy to build their homes, and extended the enclave's boundaries.

In 1869, Witt purchased for $5,000 ($ in  dollars) a house and lot at 16 Walnut Street, and donated these to the Young Women's Christian Association (YWCA) as a boarding home for single, unwed mothers. The boarding home moved in 1908 to the corner of Prospect Avenue and E. 18th Street, and was named the Stillman Witt Boarding Home in Witt's honor.

In 1884, Witt's estate built a hotel named The Stillman at Euclid Avenue and E. 21st Street. Fire destroyed its upper floors in 1885. The hotel was torn down between 1901 and 1902.

Although little is known about it, a steam tugboat was named for Stillman Witt. It operated on the Hudson River, Erie Canal, and Great Lakes, and sank in January 1858.

References
Notes

Citations

Bibliography

1808 births
1875 deaths
Businesspeople from Cleveland
American company founders
American steel industry businesspeople
Businesspeople from Worcester, Massachusetts
Burials at Albany Rural Cemetery
People who died at sea
Baptists from Massachusetts
Baptists from Ohio
Baptists from New York (state)
19th-century American businesspeople
American transportation businesspeople
19th-century Baptists